Kirkland is a civil parish in the Wyre district of Lancashire, England.   It contains 26 buildings that are recorded in the National Heritage List for England as designated listed buildings.  Of these, one is listed at Grade I, the highest of the three grades, one is at Grade II*, the middle grade, and the others are at Grade II, the lowest grade.  The parish contains the village of Churchtown and the surrounding countryside.  The most important building in the parish is St Helen's Church, which is listed together with a number of structures in or near the churchyard.  The other listed buildings include houses and cottages, a village cross, milestones, and a telephone kiosk.


Key

Buildings

References

Citations

Sources

Lists of listed buildings in Lancashire
Buildings and structures in the Borough of Wyre